The 1964 Faversham by-election was held on 4 June 1964 after the death of the incumbent Labour MP Percy Wells.  The usually marginal seat was retained by the Labour Candidate Terence Boston.

References

By-elections to the Parliament of the United Kingdom in Kent constituencies
1964 in England
1964 elections in the United Kingdom
1960s in Kent